Dennis & Gnasher: Unleashed! is a British computer-animated television series based on the Dennis the Menace strip from the British comic The Beano created by David Law. The strip first introduced in 1951. It started airing on CBBC on 6 November 2017 and is the third animated adaptation of the strip after Dennis and Gnasher and Dennis the Menace and Gnasher. The series stars Freddie Fox as Dennis. A second series began on 13 July 2020.

Plot
The series follows 10-year-old Dennis the Menace and his dog Gnasher as he teams up with his friends Pieface, JJ and Rubi to cause havoc to Walter and Beanotown and Bash Street School, in a world full of action-packed adventure where rules just get in the way.

Each episode also includes a short 2D section featuring Gnasher's fleas telling jokes.

Characters 
 Dennis (voiced by Freddie Fox in the UK dub, Bryce Papenbrook in the US dub): A 10-year-old prankster who loves to have fun and break the rules. His knack for tricks and pranks often get him in trouble.
 Gnasher (voiced by Boris Hiestand): Dennis' pet dog, an Abyssinian Wire-Haired Tripe Hound. Gnasher has teeth that can break through almost anything except titanium. If any of his teeth are removed he can grow them back in a day. 
 Peter "Pieface" Shepherd (voiced by Ryan Sampson): A slightly dim-witted boy who loves pies. He has a pet potatoe called Paul.
 Jemima 'JJ' Jones (voiced by Kathryn Drysdale in the UK dub) or Jennifer 'JJ' Jones (voiced by Dorothy Fahn in the US dub): A fun-loving thrill-seeker who has four older brothers. She is African-British. 
 Rubidium "Rubi" von Screwtop (voiced by Kelly-Marie Stewart): The daughter of Professor von Screwtop. She is ingenious and makes inventions.
 Mrs. Creecher (voiced by Joanna Ruiz): The elderly teacher of Dennis' class who has bad eyesight.
 Walter Brown (voiced by Rasmus Hardiker): Initially nicer, Walter now is cunning and ambitious, and wants to spoil Dennis' plans and is the main antagonist of the series.
 Bertie Blenkinsop (voiced by Rasmus Hardiker): Walter’s cowardly best friend.
 Wilbur Brown (voiced by Rasmus Hardiker): The mayor of Beanotown and Walter's father.
Miss Mistry (voiced by Maya Sondhi): New teacher at Bash Street School, teaching Class 3C along with Mrs Creecher.

Cast 
Freddie Fox as Dennis, the title character and a master of trouble.
Boris Hiestand as Gnasher, his pet dog, who serves as a sidekick.
Rasmus Hardiker as Walter Brown, Dennis' arch-enemy and Grizzly Griller, an explorer who is a Bear Grylls parody.
Ryan Sampson as Peter "Pieface" Shepherd. One of Dennis' best friends and with a rather odd personality and has a pet potatoe, Paul.
Kathryn Drysdale as Jemima "JJ" Jones. The most fearless girl of Dennis' friends who always tells Dennis stories that her big brothers have told her, even though they may not be true.
Kelly-Marie Stewart as Rubidium "Rubi" von Screwtop. The smartest of Dennis' friends and uses a wheelchair, as does her voice actress. She is very good at making plans. Her father is the scientist Professor von Screwtop, who first appeared in the Lord Snooty strip in the 1940s.
Joanna Ruiz as Mrs Creecher, Gran and Anne Finally - a journalist whose name is a play-on the words "And finally...".
Maya Sondhi as Miss Mistry, who joined Bash Street School as a new teacher in Series 2.

Production 
The series was first announced on 8 June 2016, when The Beano announced they were setting up a business dedicated to media based on The Beano. Dennis & Gnasher: Unleashed! will be their first production. On 5 October 2016, it was officially announced that the series would air on CBBC in 2017 and the first-ever picture of Dennis in CGI was released. On 17 March 2017, Freddie Fox was announced to be voicing Dennis, a clip of the series was also released. On 3 July 2017, Rasmus Hardiker, Ryan Sampson, Kathryn Drysdale, Kelly-Marie Stewart and Joanna Ruiz were all added to the voice cast and another clip was released.

The series was announced for a second installment on 12 February 2019, after the success of the first. Dennis & Gnasher: Unleashed! season one received nominations at Kidscreen, the British Animation awards and was nominated for an International Emmy.

The music for the series was composed by Rob Lord and Graham Kearns and the theme tune was performed by The Vaccines.

Episodes

Series 1 (2017–18)

Series 2 (2020–21)

Reception 
In its first week, it was the highest rated show on CBBC and overall the 10th most-watched programme for 6-12 year olds alongside The X Factor and Strictly Come Dancing.

References

External links
 
 

2017 British television series debuts
2010s British children's television series
2010s British animated television series
2020s British children's television series
2020s British animated television series
British children's animated comedy television series
English-language television shows
The Beano
BBC high definition shows
CBBC shows
BBC children's television shows
Television shows based on comics
Animated television series about children
Animated television series about dogs
Dennis the Menace and Gnasher